Union City is a city in Fulton County, Georgia, United States. The population was 19,456 at the 2010 census.

History
The Georgia General Assembly incorporated Union City in 1908. One source claims that the town was named for the union of rails at a railroad junction, while another version states the name commemorates a "Farmer's Union" which once was headquartered here.

Geography
Union City is located at  (33.578470, -84.543354).

Demographics

2020 census

As of the 2020 United States census, there were 26,830 people, 8,088 households, and 4,681 families residing in the city.

2010 census
At the 2010 census, there were 19,456 people living in the city. The racial makeup of the city was 81.5% Black, 8.6% White, 0.2% Native American, 0.8% Asian, 0.0% Pacific Islander, 0.3% from some other race and 1.6% from two or more races. 7.0% were Hispanic or Latino of any race.

2000 census
At the 2000 census there were 11,622 people, 4,974 households, and 2,750 families living in the city. The racial makeup of the city was 69.33% African American, 25.36% White, 0.26% Native American, 1.26% Asian, 0.03% Pacific Islander, 2.04% from other races, and 1.72% from two or more races. Hispanic or Latino of any race were 5.22%.

Of the 4,974 households 30.7% had children under the age of 18 living with them, 26.4% were married couples living together, 23.6% had a female householder with no husband present, and 44.7% were non-families. 38.5% of households were one person and 15.5% were one person aged 65 or older.  The average household size was 2.29 and the average family size was 3.05.

The age distribution was 27.2% under the age of 18, 9.0% from 18 to 24, 33.6% from 25 to 44, 16.7% from 45 to 64, and 13.5% 65 or older.  The median age was 32 years. For every 100 females, there were 79.1 males.  For every 100 females age 18 and over, there were 71.3 males.

The median household income was $35,322 and the median family income  was $39,697. Males had a median income of $30,421 versus $28,111 for females. The per capita income for the city was $17,208.  About 9.9% of families and 12.1% of the population were below the poverty line, including 14.0% of those under age 18 and 14.3% of those age 65 or over.

Education

Elementary schools

 C.H. Gullatt Elementary 
 Liberty Point Elementary
 Oakley Elementary School

Middle schools

 Bear Creek Middle (serves students in Palmetto and Fairburn) 
 Camp Creek Middle School

High school

Creekside High School (serves students in Palmetto and Fairburn)
Langston Hughes High School
Benjamin E. Banneker High School

Charter schools
 Hapeville Charter Career Academy

Colleges and universities

 Adams International University
 Georgia Military College

References

External links
 Official website
 Shadnor Baptist Church historical marker

Cities in Georgia (U.S. state)
Cities in Fulton County, Georgia